Clare Mary Smith McGlynn (born 1970) is a Professor of Law at Durham University. She specialises in the legal regulation of pornography, image-based sexual abuse (including 'revenge pornography'), violence against women, and gender equality in the legal profession.  In 2020, she was appointed an Honorary QC in recognition of her work on women's equality in the legal profession and shaping new criminal laws on extreme pornography and image-based sexual abuse. She was awarded an Honorary Doctorate from Lund University, Sweden, in 2018 in recognition of the international impact of her research on sexual violence and she is a Fellow of the Academy of Social Sciences. She has given evidence before Scottish and UK Parliaments on how to reform laws on sexual violence and online abuse, as well as speaking to policy audiences across Europe and Australia. In November 2019, she was invited to South Korea to share international best practice in supporting victims of image-based sexual abuse and she has worked with Facebook to support their policies on non-consensual intimate images. She regularly contributes to media debates about her areas of expertise, commenting in 2017 on whether pornography should be included on the school curriculum, whether it is ok to watch pornography in public, celebrity image-based sexual abuse, and on the proposed regulation of upskirting in England and Wales. She has submitted evidence to UK and Scottish Parliamentary committees. Her work with Erika Rackley on the cultural harm caused by rape pornography was instrumental in the Scottish Parliament's decision to criminalise possession of such material. McGlynn and Rackley were involved in Rape Crisis London's campaign to 'close the loophole' that makes possession of rape pornography lawful in England and Wales. The campaign was successful, and an amendment to include rape in the definition of 'extreme pornography' was incorporated into the Criminal Justice and Courts Act 2015.

Biography 

McGlynn was born in Scotland, in 1970. At the age of 18 she moved to England to begin a degree in law at Durham University. After graduating in 1991, she went on to study at the College of Law, completing her Law Society Final Examinations in 1992. Following this she returned to Durham University as a teaching fellow. It was at Durham University that she completed her Master of Jurisprudence in 1996. Over the next four years she worked as a lecturer at the nearby University of Newcastle, before returning once again to Durham University as a reader in 1999. In 2004 she was promoted to Professor of Law, and remains highly active in academic research and teaching. She has served as deputy Head of the Law School and Deputy Head of the Faculty of Social Sciences and Health (Research), where she was responsible for diversity and equality, research strategy and the Research Excellence Framework (REF2014). She was a member of the university's Taskforce on Sexual Violence and is currently a member of the university's governing body, University Council. McGlynn was also the Director of the university's ESRC Impact Acceleration Account which provides funding and support for research impact across the social sciences. She is a member of the REF2021 Law Assessment Panel which reviews all UK legal research.

McGlynn's career also extends beyond academia. From 1993 to 1995 she trained as a solicitor with Herbert Smith Freehills, qualifying as a solicitor of the Supreme Court of England and Wales in 1995. In 2013 McGlynn played a key role in the success of a campaign to criminalise rape pornography in England and Wales. She was a trustee of Rape Crisis Tyneside and Northumberland from 2009 to 2019.

Work on image-based sexual abuse 
McGlynn's research (with Erika Rackley) has developed the concept of image-based sexual abuse to describe all forms of the non-consensual creation and distribution of private sexual images, including 'revenge pornography' and upskirting. This term is now used internationally to describe these forms of abuse and McGlynn's research has shaped law reform campaigns across the world. In 2019, she published a report with colleagues Shattering Lives and Myths  drawing on interviews with over 50 victims and stakeholders which was launched in Parliament at a roundtable chaired by Maria Miller MP  and attended by many victims, criminal justice organisations, women's support groups, MPs and members of the House of Lords. Her work has played a key role in national debates, including in ITV News, and in legislative debates in the House of Lords. She has given evidence before the Scottish Justice Committee on proposed reforms in Scotland, recommending a new law focusing on the harms of victims, not the motives of the perpetrators, as well as giving presentations and evidence to policy-makers across Iceland, Ireland and Australia.

McGlynn and her colleagues argue that 'revenge pornography' should be recognized as a form of sexual assault, that it should be seen as part of a pattern of sexual violence, along with other forms of image-based sexual abuse, and subject fully to the criminal law. In particular, she and her colleague criticized the legal loophole which meant that upskirting was not fully covered by the criminal law in England and Wales.

Restorative Justice

Restorative justice and sexual violence

McGlynn and her colleagues Nicole Westmarland and Nikki Godden published the UK's first evaluation of the use of restorative justice in a case of sexual violence. Restorative justice conferences involve a victim and perpetrator meeting, along with a trained facilitator, to discuss the impact of the perpetrator's crimes. McGlynn and her colleagues interviewed the people involved in the conference, and concluded that restorative justice could be beneficial for victim survivors of sexual violence, but only if he or she is given the highest level of support prior to and throughout the process. McGlynn and her colleagues have published further academic research on the subject, created a research briefing, and shared their work at conferences and workshops across the UK, with audiences comprising survivors, restorative justice practitioners, lawyers and policy-makers. This series of work focusses on the failings of the conventional criminal justice system and on the matter of whether restorative justice may have a corresponding role to play. McGlynn has given evidence on using restorative justice as part of the Justice Select Committee's inquiry into Restorative Justice. Together with her colleague, Nicole Westmarland, McGlynn has also submitted evidence to the UK Parliament's Justice Committee inquiry into Restorative Justice.

McGlynn and colleagues have also investigated the use of restorative justice in cases of domestic abuse. In a study published in the British Journal of Criminology  they found police using ‘out of court settlements’ in many domestic abuse cases, against police best practice guidance. A research policy briefing on this research is available here.

Sentencing and sexual offences 

In 2011, Kenneth Clarke, then Minister for Justice, proposed increasing the sentencing discount awarded to defendants who plead guilty to a maximum of 50%. Public debate on this idea was impossible due to his comments made at the time of the announcement about some rapes being more serious than others. However, McGlynn has argued that while he was wrong on distinguishing between rapes, he was right to start a debate on sentencing discounts for very early guilty pleas. McGlynn argues that early guilty pleas may save some victims the trauma of pursuing a case through to court.

Influence on changes to pornography law

Criminalising rape pornography 

Possession of "extreme pornography" was made illegal in England and Wales under Section 63 of the Criminal Justice and Immigration Act 2008. However, the definition of extreme pornography within this Act does not include depictions of rape. McGlynn and her colleague Erika Rackley argued that criminal sanctions against rape pornography can be justified on the basis of the cultural harm of the material.

Scotland 

McGlynn and Rackley informed the debate on rape and extreme pornography in Scotland. Their research supported Rape Crisis Scotland's campaign to include depictions of rape in the definition of extreme pornography, and their argument for cultural harm was discussed in the Scottish media. Additionally, they disseminated their research via letter to many Scottish MSPs, and McGlynn presented the argument at a conference organised by Rape Crisis Scotland and attended by the Scottish Justice Minister. McGlynn and Rackley's argument for including rape in the definition of extreme pornography was endorsed by the Scottish Parliament's Justice Committee. The new legislation was introduced in section 42 of the Criminal Justice and Licensing (Scotland) Act 2010.

England and Wales 
Possession of extreme pornography was criminalised in England and Wales by the Criminal Justice and Immigration Act (2008). However, unlike in the Scottish Criminal Justice and Licensing Act (2010), rape was not included in the definition of extreme pornography. As such, the possession of rape pornography was not unlawful in England and Wales unless it involves serious (physical) violence. In 2013, McGlynn and Rackley played an instrumental role in the campaign to introduce an amendment that would make possession of rape pornography illegal in England and Wales. The campaign was spearheaded by Rape Crisis South London and was supported by over 100 academics and women's groups. The campaign also received support from over 73,000 people who signed its online petition, which called on the government to include depictions of rape in the classification of extreme pornography. The campaign was successful, with Prime Minister David Cameron announcing in July 2013 that the law would be amended to make possession of rape porn illegal. McGlynn and Rackley wrote of their support for these reforms, whilst also recommending further clarifications to prevent unwanted consequences, such as the criminalisation of consensual BDSM activity. The change to the law was incorporated in the Criminal Justice and Courts Act 2015 which updated the definition of extreme pornography to involve porn which depicts acts of rape in an explicit and realistic manner. Parliament's Joint Committee on Human Rights reviewed the bill and endorsed McGlynn and Rackley's argument that cultural harm provides a strong justification for criminal sanctions. The committee also endorsed their view that the extreme pornography laws are human rights enhancing. The law was passed and it became illegal to possess pornography which shows acts of rape.

Her recent research published in the Journal of Criminal Law with Dr Hannah Bows found that most prosecutions under the extreme pornography legislation are for possession of bestiality images.

Work on diversity in the legal profession

The Woman Lawyer 

McGlynn's first book The Woman Lawyer: Making the difference was published in 1998. As the first book-length study on the representation of women in the UK legal profession, it became a key reference point in debates surrounding diversity in legal contexts. In the book, McGlynn chronicles women's experiences throughout the legal profession, from law school to the judiciary. She combines her own empirical research and statistics with personal testimonies from women legal academics, lawyers and judges. These personal testimonies include contributions from Baroness Helena Kennedy, and Baroness Brenda Hale, who was the first woman on the Supreme Court. McGlynn's overarching theme is the need for reform within the legal profession; to introduce greater diversity and to challenge a culture in which women's abilities and achievements are marginalised.

Women legal academics 

In the late 1990s, McGlynn carried out the first survey into the representation of women legal academics. Whilst it had already been established that women academics in various departments faced financial disadvantage and indirect discrimination, the representation of women academics in law schools remained unknown. The survey found that only 14% of law professors were women, and only 2 in 5 law schools had any women professors at all. In her paper about the findings, McGlynn discusses the impact of this under-representation of women upon the education of law students. She expands upon this in her article for the Times Higher Education Supplement, in which she states that popular culture often equates the law with men and 'masculine' attributes. This view is perpetuated by the predominance of male lawyers in senior positions. Stereotypes which suggest that women are less objective or neutral than men can harm women's prospects in the legal profession, and the lack of women lawyers in higher positions can enforce these perceptions.

See also 

Nicole Westmarland
Rape Crisis England and Wales
Durham Law School

External links 
Prof McGlynn's staff page at Durham University
Gender and Law at Durham (GLAD)
Rape Crisis Tyneside and Northumberland
End Violence against Women (EVAW)
Prof Clare McGlynn's page on Twitter
Professor McGlynn’s webpage

References 

Scottish legal scholars
Academics of Durham University
1970 births
Living people